Ealthon Perry Smith (born March 29, 1951) is a former American football cornerback who played nine seasons in the National Football League (NFL). Smith was a 4th round selection (92nd overall pick) in the 1973 NFL Draft by the Oakland Raiders out of Colorado State University. He would play for the Green Bay Packers (1973–1976), the St. Louis Cardinals (1977–1979), and the Denver Broncos (1980–1981).

References

External links
NFL.com player page

1951 births
Living people
American football cornerbacks
Colorado State Rams football players
Colorado Mesa Mavericks football players
Green Bay Packers players
St. Louis Cardinals (football) players
Denver Broncos players
Sportspeople from Spartanburg, South Carolina